Julia Roy (born 12 December 1989) is a French actress and screenwriter.

Biography
Julia Roy was born on 12 December 1989 in Paris, France. She grew up in Vienna, Austria. After graduating from the Lycée Français de Vienne, she attended the Cours Florent and the Royal Central School of Speech and Drama.

She has appeared in films such as If You Don't, I Will and Eva, in which she starred opposite Isabelle Huppert and Gaspard Ulliel. She starred opposite Mathieu Amalric in Benoît Jacquot's 2016 film Never Ever, for which she also wrote the screenplay based on Don DeLillo's novel The Body Artist. The film premiered at the 73rd Venice International Film Festival and was also shown at the Toronto International Film Festival. In 2019 she played with Vincent Lindon in Dernier Amour, and in 2021 she played alongside Charlotte Gainsbourg in the film Suzanna Andler, based on Marguerite Duras's play. She was nominated in the category Révélations at the French Césars Awards. 

Julia Roy served as one of the jury members at the Cabourg Film Festival in 2016.

She currently studies at Columbia University.

Feature films
 If You Don't, I Will (2014)
 Never Ever (2016)
 Kafka's Lovers (2017)
 Eva (2018)
 Dernier Amour (2019)
 Stroke of Luck (2020)
 Suzanna Andler (2021)

Short films
Telencephale (2012)
Les Filles de L'Hiver (2013)
Les Revelations (2017)
Einstein's Telescope (2021)

References

External links

 

1989 births
Living people
21st-century French actresses
Actresses from Paris
Actresses from Vienna
French screenwriters
Alumni of the Royal Central School of Speech and Drama
French women screenwriters
French expatriates in Austria